Miss Malaysia Universe 2008, the 42nd edition of the Miss Universe Malaysia, was held on 30 May 2008 at Gardens Hotel, Kuala Lumpur. Levy Li of Terengganu was crowned by the outgoing titleholder, Adelaine Chin of Sarawak at the end of the event. She then represented Malaysia at the Miss Universe 2008 pageant in Nha Trang, Vietnam.

Results

References 

2008 in Malaysia
2008 beauty pageants
2008